is a Japanese volleyball player.
She plays for the Japan women's national volleyball team.

Career 
She participated in the 2017 FIVB Volleyball Women's World Grand Champions Cup.

Clubs

References

External links 
 Player profile, FIVB
 Player profile, CEV
player profile 東レアローズ 総合トップ男子女子 東レ株式会社

1992 births
Living people
Japanese women's volleyball players
Japanese people of Canadian descent
Volleyball players at the 2014 Asian Games
Asian Games competitors for Japan